Arya Nagar Assembly constituency is one of 403 legislative assembly seats of the Uttar Pradesh. It is part of the Kanpur Lok Sabha constituency.

Overview
Arya Nagar comprises Wards No. 1, 26, 29, 52, 54, 55, 62, 69, 72, 76, 78, 89, 91, 94, 99, 102, 105, 106, 108, 110 in Kanpur Municipal Corporation, Central Railway Colony (OG) – Ward No. 111 & Rawatpur Station Yard (OG) – Ward No. 112 of 2-Kanpur Sadar Tehsil.

Members of Legislative Assembly

Election results

2022

2017

2012

2007

2002

1996

1993

p

1991

p

1989

1985

 
|-
! style="background-color:#E9E9E9" align=left width=225|Party
! style="background-color:#E9E9E9" align=right|Seats won
! style="background-color:#E9E9E9" align=right|Seat change
|-
|align=left|Bharatiya Janata Party
| align="center" | 3
| align="center" | 1
|-
|align=left|Samajwadi Party
| align="center" | 1
| align="center" | 0
|-
|align=left|Indian National Congress
| align="center" | 1
| align="center" | 1
|-
|}

See also
 List of Vidhan Sabha constituencies of Uttar Pradesh

References

External links
 

Politics of Kanpur
Assembly constituencies of Uttar Pradesh